A magnetic flow meter (mag meter, electromagnetic flow meter) is a transducer that measures fluid flow by the voltage induced across the liquid by its flow through a magnetic field. A magnetic field is applied to the metering tube, which results in a potential difference proportional to the flow velocity perpendicular to the flux lines. The physical principle at work is electromagnetic induction. The magnetic flow meter requires a conducting fluid, for example, water that contains ions, and an electrical insulating pipe surface, for example, a rubber-lined steel tube.

If the magnetic field direction were constant, electrochemical and other effects at the electrodes would make the potential difference 
difficult to distinguish from the fluid flow induced potential difference.  To show this in modern magnetic flowmeters, the magnetic field is constantly reversed, cancelling out the electrochemical potential difference, which does not change direction with the magnetic field. This however prevents the use of permanent magnets for magnetic flowmeters.

See also
 Electromagnetic pump 
 Flow measurement
 Magnetohydrodynamics
 Water metering

External links
3D animation of the Electromagnetic Flow Measuring Principle
eFunda: Introduction to Magnetic Flowmeters
Principles of Electromagnetic Flow Measurement
eLearning course on electromagnetic flow meters

Flow meters
Electromagnetic components